Hold Back the River may refer to:

 Holding Back the River, a 1989 album by Wet Wet Wet
 "Hold Back the River" (Wet Wet Wet song), a song from the above album
 "Hold Back the River" (James Bay song)